Joshua B. Bush (born March 6, 1989) is a former American football free safety. He was drafted by the New York Jets in the sixth round of the 2012 NFL Draft. He was also a member of the Denver Broncos and won Super Bowl 50 with the team over his home state Carolina Panthers. He played college football at Wake Forest.

High school career
Bush attended West Davidson High School where he was a standout player, on both sides of the ball. Bush was The 2006 Dispatch All-County Defensive Player of the Year after intercepting six passes as a senior. He also played quarterback as a senior, throwing for 676 yards and rushing for 642. He was an all-conference baseball player his junior year and played for the Post 8 American Legion team that went to the state finals.

College career
Bush attended Wake Forest University in Winston-Salem, North Carolina. He was a redshirt his freshman year and did not see any playing time. After redshirting in 2007 at Wake, Bush saw limited action as a redshirt freshman, making 17 tackles. He was used mostly at free safety in his sophomore year and had one interception. That one pick was a big one — it ended Russell Wilson's NCAA record of 379 passes without an interception. He played both cornerback and free safety as a junior, starting eight games and recording 33 tackles. As a senior free safety, Bush led the Demon Deacons with six interceptions and was named first-team all-Atlantic Coast Conference. He was also a third-team All-American selection.

Professional career

New York Jets
The New York Jets drafted Bush with the 27th pick of the 6th round (187th overall) in the 2012 NFL Draft. Bush signed a four-year contract on May 6, 2012. He was released on October 15, 2014.

Denver Broncos
Bush was signed to the Denver Broncos' practice squad on November 18, 2014. 
On December 28, 2014, Bush intercepted Oakland Raiders quarterback Derek Carr in a 47-14 win to end the regular season. On October 1, 2015, he was waived by the team.

Buffalo Bills
Bush was signed by the Buffalo Bills on October 14, 2015 after safety Aaron Williams was placed on short-term IR. He was released by the team on October 23, 2015.

Denver Broncos (second stint)
On December 1, 2015, the Denver Broncos signed Bush to the active roster.
On February 7, 2016, Bush was part of the Broncos team that won Super Bowl 50. In the game, the Broncos defeated the Carolina Panthers by a score of 24–10. Bush recorded two tackles in the Super Bowl.

Post-playing career
Bush joined Richard Childress Racing in 2021 as a pit crew member. He made his debut in the NASCAR Cup Series in the Coca-Cola 600 as the rear tire changer for Austin Dillon.

References

External links
 
 Wake Forest Demon Deacons bio
 New York Jets bio

1989 births
Living people
People from Lexington, North Carolina
Players of American football from North Carolina
American football cornerbacks
American football safeties
Wake Forest Demon Deacons football players
New York Jets players
Denver Broncos players
Buffalo Bills players